This list of museums in Cumbria, England contains museums which are defined for this context as institutions (including nonprofit organizations, government entities, and private businesses) that collect and care for objects of cultural, artistic, scientific, or historical interest and make their collections or related exhibits available for public viewing. Also included are non-profit art galleries and university art galleries.  Museums that exist only in cyberspace (i.e., virtual museums) are not included.

Defunct museums
 Cars of the Stars Motor Museum, Keswick, closed in 2011 
 Cumberland Toy and Model Museum, Cockermouth, website
 Florence Mine Heritage Centre, Egremont
 James Bond Museum, Keswick, closed in 2011 
 Keswick Mining Museum, Cotehill, website
 Lanternhouse International, Ulverston, website
 RAF Millom Museum, closed in 2010

References

 Visit Cumbria

See also
 Visitor attractions in Cumbria

 
Cumbria
Museums